Trousseau sign is the name of two distinct phenomena observed in clinical medicine. Both are attributed to Armand Trousseau: 

 Trousseau sign of latent tetany
 Trousseau sign of malignancy (aka migratory thrombophlebitis)